Dorsal ligament can refer to:
 Dorsal radioulnar ligament
 Dorsal radiocarpal ligament
 Dorsal cuboideonavicular ligament
 Dorsal intercarpal ligament
 Dorsal intercuneiform ligaments
 Dorsal tarsometatarsal ligaments
 Dorsal metatarsal ligaments